Make Djibouti is an EP by Hetch Hetchy, released in 1988 through Texas Hotel Records. It was produced by vocalist Lynda Stipe's older brother Michael Stipe, of the band R.E.M.

Track listing

Personnel 
Adapted from the Make Djibouti liner notes.

Hetch Hetchy
Rene Garcia – percussion
Lynda Stipe – lead vocals, bass guitar
Donna Smith – keyboards, backing vocals

Production and additional personnel
Michael Meister – backing vocals
Armistead Wellford – clarinet, bass guitar
Evan Player – bass guitar, percussion
Michael Stipe – production

Release history

References

External links 
 

1988 EPs
Albums produced by Michael Stipe
Hetch Hetchy (band) albums
Texas Hotel Records EPs